Florida Girls is an American sitcom created by and starring Laura Chinn. It follows four women who live in a trailer park, played by Chinn, Melanie Field, Patty Guggenheim, and Laci Mosley. The series premiered on Pop on July 10, 2019. On October 3, 2019, the series was renewed for a second season, but on March 3, 2020, Pop cancelled the show along with several other originals.

Synopsis
Florida Girls follows a group of four women, who live in a trailer park in Florida. When one of their friends receives her GED and moves out of state, Shelby becomes unsatisfied with the status quo, and aspires to do the same with her friends.

Cast
Laura Chinn as Shelby
Melanie Field as Kaitlin 
Patty Guggenheim as Erica
Laci Mosley as Jayla
Patrick Roper as Ken
 William Tokarsky as Chuck
 Kym Whitley as Shelby's Mom
 Kim H. Howard as Deborah
 Chris Williams as Harold
 Scott MacArthur as Devo
 Courtney Pauroso as Crystal Meth
 Ben Bladon as Wattie

Episodes

Reception

Critical response
On review aggregator Rotten Tomatoes, the series holds an approval rating of 91% based on 11 reviews." On Metacritic, it has a weighted average score of 69 out of 100, based on 6 critics, indicating "generally favorable reviews".

Time wrote "Florida Girls may well turn out to be the most enjoyable new show of the summer." The New York Times described the show as "more endearing than challenging, more amiable than thought-provoking, clever enough to engage but not necessarily funny enough to enchant."

References

External links

2010s American sitcoms
2019 American television series debuts
2019 American television series endings
English-language television shows
Television series by 3 Arts Entertainment
Television series by Lionsgate Television
Television shows set in Florida
Women in Florida
Pop (American TV channel) original programming